A push-button (also spelled pushbutton) or simply button is a simple switch mechanism to control some aspect of a machine or a process. Buttons are typically made out of hard material, usually plastic or metal. The surface is usually flat or shaped to accommodate the human finger or hand, so as to be easily depressed or pushed. Buttons are most often biased switches, although many un-biased buttons (due to their physical nature) still require a spring to return to their un-pushed state.

Terms for the "pushing" of a button include pressing, depressing, mashing, slapping, hitting, and punching.

Uses 

The "push-button" has been utilized in calculators, push-button telephones, kitchen appliances, and various other mechanical and electronic devices, home and commercial.

In industrial and commercial applications, push buttons can be connected together by a mechanical linkage so that the act of pushing one button causes the other button to be released. In this way, a stop button can "force" a start button to be released. This method of linkage is used in simple manual operations in which the machine or process has no electrical circuits for control.

Red pushbuttons can also have large heads (called mushroom heads) for easy operation and to facilitate the stopping of a machine. These pushbuttons are called emergency stop buttons and for increased safety are mandated by the electrical code in many jurisdictions. This large mushroom shape can also be found in buttons for use with operators who need to wear gloves for their work and could not actuate a regular flush-mounted push button.

As an aid for operators and users in industrial or commercial applications, a pilot light is commonly added to draw the attention of the user and to provide feedback if the button is pushed. Typically this light is included into the center of the pushbutton and a lens replaces the pushbutton hard center disk. The source of the energy to illuminate the light is not directly tied to the contacts on the back of the pushbutton but to the action the pushbutton controls. In this way a start button when pushed will cause the process or machine operation to be started and a secondary contact designed into the operation or process will close to turn on the pilot light and signify the action of pushing the button caused the resultant process or action to start.

To avoid an operator from pushing the wrong button in error, pushbuttons are often color-coded to associate them with their function. Commonly used colors are red for stopping the machine or process and green for starting the machine or process.

In popular culture, the phrase "the button" (sometimes capitalized) refers to a (usually fictional) button that a military or government leader could press to launch nuclear weapons.

Scram and scramble switches 
Akin to fire alarm switches, some big red buttons, when deployed with suitable visual and audible warnings such as flashing lights and sirens for extreme exigent emergencies, are known as "scram switches" (from the slang term  scram, "get out of here"). Generally, such buttons are connected to large scale functions, beyond a regular fire alarm, such as automated shutdown procedures, complete facility power cut, fire suppression like halon release, etc.

A variant of this is the scramble switch which triggers an alarm to activate emergent personnel to proactively attend to and go to such disasters. An air raid siren at an air base initiates such action, where the fighter pilots are alerted and "scrambled" to their planes to defend the base.

History
Push buttons were invented sometime in the late 19th century, certainly no later than 1880.  The name came from the French word bouton (something that sticks out), rather than from the kind of buttons used on clothing.  The initial public reaction was curiosity mixed with fear, some of which was due to widespread fear of electricity, which was a relatively new technology at the time.

See also

 Event-driven programming
 Button accordion
 Button (computing)
 Keyboard (computing)
 Panic button
 Placebo button
 Push-button telephone
 Reset button
 Shutter button
 Turbo button

References

Further reading

 Rachel Plotnick, Power Button: A History of Pleasure, Panic and the Politics of Pushing, MIT Press, 2018, reviewed in David Trotter, "Making doorbells ring", London Review of Books 22 November 2018

External links 

 Spring Return Button by Sándor Kabai, The Wolfram Demonstrations Project.

Human–machine interaction
Switches